Zadilske is a remote selo (village) in Stryi Raion, Lviv Oblast, of western Ukraine.  It belongs to Kozova rural hromada, one of the hromadas of Ukraine. Local government is administered by Zadilska village council.

Until 18 July 2020, Zadilske belonged to Skole Raion. The raion was abolished in July 2020 as part of the administrative reform of Ukraine, which reduced the number of raions of Lviv Oblast to seven. The area of Skole Raion was merged into Stryi Raion.

Geography 
Zadilske is situated in the Carpathian Mountains.

Religious structures 
The village has an architectural monument of local importance of Stryi Raion –
Church of St. Demetrios (wooden) 19th century (1495-M)

References

External links 
 village Zadilske
 weather.in.ua

Villages in Stryi Raion